The 2022–23 Minnesota Duluth Bulldogs men's ice hockey season will be the 79th season of play for the program. They represent the University of Minnesota Duluth in the 2022–23 NCAA Division I men's ice hockey season and for the 10th season in the National Collegiate Hockey Conference (NCHC). The Bulldogs will be coached by Scott Sandelin, in his 23rd season, and play their home games at AMSOIL Arena.

Season

Departures

Recruiting

Roster
As of July 28, 2022.

Standings

Schedule and results

|-
!colspan=12 style=";" | Regular Season

|-
!colspan=12 style=";" |

Scoring statistics

Goaltending statistics

Rankings

References

2022-23
Minnesota Duluth Bulldogs
Minnesota Duluth Bulldogs
Minnesota-Duluth Bulldogs
Minnesota-Duluth Bulldogs